Antun Grego (born 8 December 1940) is a Croatian sailor. He competed at the 1968 Summer Olympics and the 1972 Summer Olympics. In the Snipe class, Grego was the European champion in 1966, runner-up in 1968, and bronze medallist in the 1967 World Championship.

References

External links
 

1940 births
Living people
Croatian male sailors (sport)
Olympic sailors of Yugoslavia
Sailors at the 1968 Summer Olympics – Flying Dutchman
Sailors at the 1972 Summer Olympics – Flying Dutchman
People from Primorje-Gorski Kotar County
Snipe class sailors
20th-century Croatian people